Jing County or Jingxian is a county in the south of Anhui Province, People's Republic of China, under the jurisdiction of the prefecture-level city of Xuancheng. The government of Jing County is located in Jingchuan Town.

Jing County has jurisdiction over eleven towns and four townships.

The county is known for its production of Xuan paper and its historic villages.

Administrative divisions
Jing County is divided to 7 towns and 2 townships.
Towns

Townships
Changqiao Township
Tingxi Township

Climate

Tourism 
Tourist spots
Preservation of the county's historic villages has been challenging. According to a local official, "The key to preserving villages such as Chaji ... was to convince villagers to stay and not move away to work in the big cities." Tourist facilities for visitors to Chaji "have been built on the periphery of the ancient village to retain its pastoral landscape."

References 

County-level divisions of Anhui
Xuancheng